Anusorn "Tai" Bundit is a Thai volleyball coach

Career
Bundit who became known affectionally as Coach Tai in the Philippines, has coached in his home country of Thailand. He was coach of the country's B national team and a professional club in the Thai premier league. He was a coach of the Thailand women's national team at the 2006 Asian Games which placed fourth.

In 2014, Bundit was tasked by the Ateneo de Manila University in the Philippines to lead its women's team at the UAAP. Despite limited English fluency, he was able to stir the team to win their first ever championship in UAAP Season 76. This was followed by another title in Season 77. He would coach Ateneo until 2018, last mentoring the team in Season 80.

Bundit became head coach of the Creamline Cool Smashers of the Premier Volleyball League. He helped the team win three PVL titles and two-runner up finishes.

He was named as an assistant coach of the Philippine women's national team under the Philippine National Volleyball Federation (PNVF). Bundit resigned from the national team in August 2021, citing family reasons amidst rising COVID-19 cases in Thailand amidst a pandemic. This also rendered his status with Creamline as uncertain as he returned to Thailand.

In January 2022, Creamline stated that it is working to bring back Bundit to the Philippines and maintains that he still the team's coach. However due to the COVID-19 situation in Thailand, Creamline advised Bundit to stay in Thailand. Sherwin Meneses was appointed to lead the team in lieu of Bundit at least for the PVL Open Conference.

Nakhon Ratchasima announced Bundit as their head coach on November 2022.

References

Tai Bundit
Living people
Thai expatriate sportspeople in the Philippines
Year of birth missing (living people)
Tai Bundit